The Mir Chakar Khan Rind University of Technology ( Balochi: میر چاکر خان رند یونیورسٹی) is a public university located in Dera Ghazi Khan District, Punjab, Pakistan. It was named after a Baloch folk hero Mir Chakar Khan Rind.

References

External links
 MCUT official website

2019 establishments in Pakistan
Public universities and colleges in Punjab, Pakistan
Universities and colleges in Dera Ghazi Khan District
Vocational education in Pakistan